Gheorghe Șerbănoiu (15 October 1950 – 25 March 2013) was a Romanian former footballer who played as a right midfielder. In 2009 Șerbănoiu received the Honorary Citizen of Timișoara title.

Honours
Steagul Roșu Brașov
Divizia B: 1968–69

Politehnica Timișoara
Divizia B: 1983–84
Cupa României: 1979–80

References

External links

Romanian footballers
Association football midfielders
1950 births
2013 deaths
Liga I players
Liga II players
FC Brașov (1936) players
FC Politehnica Timișoara players
Sportspeople from Brașov